Athadu ( or ) is a 2005 Indian Telugu-language action thriller film written and directed by Trivikram Srinivas. The film stars Mahesh Babu, Trisha, and Sonu Sood while Sayaji Shinde, Kota Srinivasa Rao, Prakash Raj, Nassar, and Brahmanandam play supporting roles. It is produced by D. Kishore and M. Ram Mohan under the Jayabheri Arts banner. The soundtrack was composed by Mani Sharma. K. V. Guhan handled the cinematography of the film while Sreekar Prasad edited it.

The film went on to become one of the highest grossing Telugu films and marked Mahesh Babu's career resurgence after a few unsuccessful films. It won 3 Nandi Awards and a Filmfare Awards South in Best Director category. It was later remade in Indian Bengali as Wanted (2010) and in Hindi as Ek: The Power of One (2009).

Plot 
After planning the hit and escape with his friend and partner-in-crime Malli, Nandu prepares to shoot, but someone shoots Shiva Reddy dead instead. The police immediately surround the building, and Nandu watches in shock as Malli is killed after his car collides with a tanker. Cornered by the police, Nandu jumps off the building and onto a train. In one of the compartments, he meets Pardhasaradhi Pardhu, who is returning to his village, Basarlapudi, after running away 12 years ago.

Later that same night, the police arrive at Gudivada and the SI of the search party spots Nandu and fires at him, but accidentally hits Pardhu instead. Nandu escapes in the ensuing confusion and arrives at Basarlapudi, and thinking that he is Pardhu, the latter's family rejoices at his return. Pardhu's cousin Poori is instantly smitten with him and constantly tries to get his attention. As Nandu grows closer to his new family, he solves many of their problems. Nandu discloses his identity to Pardhu's childhood friend Ramana in a subsequent conversation. Pardhu's grandfather, Satya Narayana Murthy, shows Nandu a shotgun that Pardhu's father (his son) used for hunting, telling him that his son died after being hit with a ricocheting bullet caused by a stone plugging the barrel.

Meanwhile, CBI officer Anjaneya Prasad is handed the case of Shiva Reddy's murder. His initial investigation turns up three issues:

 The weapon which was left was not fired
 That Shiva Reddy couldn't be shot in the center of the head from this angle.
 The police surrounded the building as if they were tipped off.

He then follows the trail of the train and finds out about the death of actual Pardhu. Suspecting Pardhu may not be who he claims, and hoping to match his fingerprints to the gun present at the crime scene, Prasad arrives at Basarlapudi and questions Nandu and tries to get his fingerprints, but is outsmarted. 

The subsequent investigation leads him to the accident that prevented Nandu from escaping; however, probing into that angle reveals that both vehicles involved in the accident (Malli's car and a petrol tanker) were hired by Malli, resulting in another dead end, leading to Prasad meeting with ex-gangster Sadhu, who is Nandu and Malli's mentor in prison. Sadhu confirms that Malli only plans the escape, and that Nandu is the one Prasad is looking for, leaving Prasad to realize that Nandu is masquerading as Pardhu. He also learns that they would have kept their money in banks, and locates Nandu's bank account by searching for accounts that had a sudden inflow of money in the days leading to Shiva Reddy's assassination. 

Prasad learns of a transfer that took place recently, and heads to the destination bank to check, discovering the transfer was a  cheque encashed by Murthy for Poori's sister's marriage that was taken from Nandu's account. Prasad calls the house and tricks Nandu into responding to his real name. Nandu flees before Prasad arrives at the house. Prasad breaks the news of Pardhu's death to the family and of Nandu's masquerade, leaving them devastated. Nandu returns amidst outrage from the other family members for his deceit and explains that though he intended to break the news of Pardhu's death to the family, he couldn't bring himself to do it after meeting Pardhu's aunt and grandfather. He also explains that though he lied about Pardhu, he never tried to deceive the family by pretending to be Pardhu. 

Murthy takes him into his study room, where he emphasizes that despite the chance to escape, Nandu came and helped the family with their issues, despite the family's criticisms, and had stood in silence in front of Murthy for no reason, which is why he considers Nandu as Pardhu. Murthy hands the family gun to Nandu, urging him to seek out who framed him and clear his name. Nandu calls up Shiva Reddy's deputy Baji Reddy and threatens him with the recording of their earlier conversation. From Baji Reddy, Nandu learns that Malli (who faked his death) called Baji Reddy after him that day and offered to do the job for half. Baji Reddy instead offered Malli  to kill Shiva Reddy in a move to become the CM himself. 

Letting Baji Reddy know that he recorded the conversation, Nandu heads to Malli's location; Prasad and the team spot him at an intersection, and one of Prasad's colleagues, Ravi opens fire at him but misses. Nandu manages to escape in the ensuing commotion, leaving Prasad to question Ravi on how much he was offered to kill Nandu. Nandu finds Malli in a church, and Malli reveals that instead of working along with Nandu and getting only half, he decided to take up Baji Reddy's offer and kill Shiva Reddy. By placing the blame on Nandu, Malli would get  from both him and Baji Reddy. Both are ambushed by the SI and other officers sent by Baji Reddy, but Nandu dispatches the cops where he engages in hand-to-hand combat with Malli and overpowers him. 

Both run for a weapon, and Malli picks up Nandu's shotgun. Realizing that Nandu's gun is empty, Malli prepares to kill Nandu, only to be killed by the round backfiring, revealing a marble was stuck in the barrel. When Prasad arrives at the scene, he receives the recording from Nandu. Prasad meets with Baji Reddy and plays the Caasette. When Baji Reddy remarks that this won't guarantee his conviction, Prasad states that Shiva Reddy's son Pratap Reddy will kill Baji Reddy when he hears the cassette in court. Seeing no other option, Baji Reddy kills himself. Nandu immerses Pardhu's ashes and meets up with Prasad, who exonerates Nandu by placing the blame on Baji Reddy and Malli, allowing Nandu to return to Basarlapudi.

Cast 

 Mahesh Babu as Nanda Gopal (Nandu) who takes up the identity of Pardhu
 Manoj Nandam as Young Nandu
 Trisha as Poori, Pardhu's cousin
 Sonu Sood as Malli, Nandu's partner
 Prakash Raj as CBI  Officer Anjaneya Prasad 
 Sayaji Shinde as Shiva Reddy, opposition party leader and Pratap Reddy's father
 Kota Srinivasa Rao as Baaji Reddy, Shiva Reddy's close aide
 Nassar as Satya Narayana Murthy, Pardhu's grandfather
 Brahmanandam as Krishna Murthy, Poori's uncle
 Sunil as Ramana, Pardhu's friend
 Rahul Dev as Sadhu, a local don
 Rajiv Kanakala as Pardhasaradhi "Pardhu"
 Ajay as Pratap Reddy, Shiva Reddy's son
 Sudha as Poori's mother
 Giri Babu as Poori's father
 Dharmavarapu Subramanyam as Poori's uncle
 Shruthi as Dharmavarapu Subramanyam's wife
 Hema as Krishna Murthy's wife/Poori's aunt
 Charan Raj as Police Officer
 Tanikella Bharani as Naidu
 Brahmaji as Nagasamudram Bujji
 Posani Krishna Murali as Farooq, Shiva Reddy's aide
 Ravi Prakash as Ravi, Anjaneya Prasad's assistant
 Harsha Vardhan as Harsha, car agency owner
 Venkata Giridhar Vajja as Giri, Pardhu's friend
 Harika as Lalitha, Poori's sister
 Prabhu as Sub-inspector 
 M. S. Narayana as Tea Shop's customer 
 Ananth as Doctor
 Jaya Prakash Reddy
 Gundu Sudarshan 
 Rallapalli
 Shanoor Sana
 K. Vishwanath as CBI Officer K. S. Patanjali (special appearance)

Production

Development 
In an interview with the media about his film Julai, Trivikram shared his views on this film, stating :

Casting 
Initially, Trivikram wanted to do this film with Pawan Kalyan and narrated the script. But he did not show much interest in signing the film and also slept during script narration. Mahesh Babu listened to the script of this film in 2002 but Trvikram and the film's producers had to wait for him till he completes the shooting schedules of S. J. Surya's science fiction film Naani and Gunasekhar's family drama Arjun as they were his existing commitments then. The shooting started a month later after the completion of Arjun. For his characterization and the dialogues uttered by the character he played, Mahesh had to adjust to Trivikram's style of dialogues, which took 10 days. Trisha Krishnan was selected for the leading female role. In an interview with the media on 29 June 2005 at the event of audio release stated that she would be seen in a role with shades of comedy though she added that her role was a limited one.

Murali Mohan later revealed that he wanted his friend and former Telugu actor Sobhan Babu to play the role of Satya Narayana Murthy, which would have marked his comeback film which was busy with a highly profitable real estate business then. For the same, Murali Mohan even issued and sent a blank cheque to Sobhan Babu's residence at Chennai as the remuneration. But Sobhan Babu refused to do that role and rejected the offer politely. Later, Nassar portrayed that role with S. P. Balasubrahmanyam dubbing for him in frail voice and his performance was appreciated by critics.

Filming 
For the film's shoot, 160 motion cameras were imported from London to shoot time-freeze effect shots in action sequences which were clarified by Mahesh himself as still cameras only. Because of non compromising, not more than 10 shots were shot per day. 4 to 5 complicated action sequences were shot under the supervision of Peter Hein with much finesse, and the climax sequence was shot indoors, which took enormous time to complete thus making the principal photography end after a span of two years. A big set was constructed at Ramanaidu Studios in Nanakramguda at Hyderabad where most of the film's family scenes were shot. On 7 August 2004, a scene featuring Mahesh and Sunil was shot on the bridge of the lake at ICRISAT campus in Hyderabad.

Soundtrack 

Mani Sharma composed the music for this film marking his first collaboration with Trivikram Srinivas and eighth collaboration with Mahesh Babu. The film's soundtrack was released by Mahesh Babu's father and prominent Telugu actor Krishna on 29 June 2005 at the house set of the film constructed at Nanakramguda through Maruthi Music label. This album consists of six melodies composed by Mani Sharma while Sirivennela Sitaramasastri and Viswa penned the lyrics. Apart from Krishna, the film's lead pair, producers, and Maruthi Music representatives attended the event.

The audio received moderately positive response from critics. IndiaGlitz wrote "Mani Sharma has tried to please all. If you are going to compare this one with his previous offerings for Mahesh, it does not do any one any good. On its own, the album has its moments." Upon the film's release, Mani Sharma's work was acclaimed by the critics and audience alike. IndiaGlitz wrote "Mani Sharma's music, especially the title song, is very good. His re-recording also fits the bill." idlebrain.com wrote "Music by Mani Sharma is good. The picturization of the first song which comes as background song for titles is wonderful. Neetho Cheppana song has got typical Mexican music. Background music and rerecording of the film is good." Sify.com wrote "The highlights of Athadu are the camerawork of K. V. Guhan and the melodious music and background score of Mani Sharma. The Neeto Chappana number picturised in the tea estates of Darjeeling is the pick of the album." Songs Sung By Eminent Singers Like S. P. Balasubrahmanyam, K. S. Chithra, Kavita Krishnamurti, Shreya Ghoshal, Mahalakshmi Iyer, KK etc

Release

Domestic 
The film released in 79 centers in Nizam region in Andhra Pradesh and was distributed by Maruthi Movies in which 3 centers screened the film for only 2 days. The film released in 24 centers across Visakhapatnam and was distributed by Sri Venkateswara Films. Sri Bharathi Pictures released the film in Krishna district in 18 centers. The film was released simultaneously in 3 screens in Chennai and it was also the first Telugu film to do so.

Overseas 
The film was released with 6 prints in United States and was distributed by Vishnu Mudda and Soma Kancherla of Crown DVD distribution company. Because of the demand, another print was imported from India for screening. The film's first screening in USA happened at Cine Plaza 13 at North Bergen on the night of 11 August 2005. At Connecticut, a special screening was conducted on 19 August 2005. Initially one show was planned but because of the demand another show was screened. There at the theater, a turn out of 442 people was observed which included standing audience for 434 seats and about 60 could not be accommodated. Apart from USA, the film released in selected screens in United Kingdom, Singapore, Germany and Australia.

Home media 
The DVD of the movie was released by Aditya Music under its Aditya Video Brand and won the best DVD award for its quality and is considered to be one of the highest sold DVDs in Tollywood history. After 7 years, Star Maa renewed the contract by paying an amount of 3.5 crores which was a record price for a 2005 Telugu film.

Dubbed versions and remakes 
The film was remade in Hindi as Ek: The Power of One (2009), in Bangladeshi Bengali as Rastar Chele  (2009), in Indian Bengali as Wanted (2010), and in Urdu as The Power of One (2013).

Despite the remakes in different languages, the film was dubbed and released in Tamil, Hindi, Malayalam, Bhojpuri, English, and Polish as Nandhu, Cheetah: The Power of One (2013), The Target, Khiladi Bhaiya (2013), The Power of One, and Poszukiwany respectively.

Reception

Critical reception 
Sify stated, "The highlight of the film is Mahesh Babu who looks cool, confident and competent as a hit man with his expressive body language and mannerisms. Athadu just about makes it as a slickly packaged entertainer but only for want of a better alternative." IndiaGlitz gave a review stating, "The story sure has splendid potential, but the director does not use them to the hilt simply because he attempts to do too many things almost simultaneously. Yet, all things considered, Athadu is a good entertainer. The problem is you can't praise it as the best yet cannot rubbish it as being useless. It is somewhere in between with more pluses than minuses." Cinegoer.net gave a review stating, "True the film gives an image of a Hollywood base for the drama. Even the taking, screenplay structure and execution of scenes, less talk and more action – all add to this image. But there are elements in this film that only a Telugu man can do it originally. That is the love track. And the way Trivikram put to view the scenic structure between Mahesh Babu and Trisha is impressive and refreshing."

Box office 
The film netted  1 million from 3 screens in Chennai in its opening weekend debuting at second position pushing Shankar's Anniyan down to the third place. The film had a 50 days run in 205 centers and a 100-day run in 38 centres. The film had a 175-day run in Sudarshan 35 mm, Hyderabad, grossing  1.40 crores from the theater.,

Accolades

Notes

References

External links 
 
 

2005 films
2000s Telugu-language films
2005 action thriller films
Films directed by Trivikram Srinivas
Telugu films remade in other languages
Indian action thriller films
Films scored by Mani Sharma
Films about contract killing in India